Bull Lake is a lake in geographic Devonshire Township in the municipality of Sioux Narrows-Nestor Falls, Kenora District, Ontario, Canada. The primary outflow is an unnamed creek to Mac Lake, whose waters flow via the Black River into Lake of the Woods.

See also
List of lakes in Ontario

References

Other map sources:

Lakes of Kenora District